Lasiodiplodia gilanensis is an endophytic fungus. It was first isolated in Gilan Province, Iran, hence its name. It has since been isolated in other plants in other continents, and is considered a plant pathogen. L. gilanensis is phylogenetically related to L. plurivora, but can be distinguished by its conidial dimensions. Also, the paraphyses of the former are up to 95μm long and 4μm wide, whereas those of L. plurivora are up to 130μm long and 10μm wide. At the same time, the basal 1–3 cells in the paraphyses of L. plurivora are broader than its apical cells.

Description
Its conidiomata are stromatic and pycnidial; its mycelium being uniloculate and non-papillate, with a central ostiole. Paraphyses are hyaline and cylindrical. Conidiophores are absent in this species. Its conidiogenous cells are holoblastic and also hyaline, while its conidia are aseptate and ellipsoid.

References

Further reading
Van der Linde, Johannes Alwyn, et al. "Lasiodiplodia species associated with dying Euphorbia ingens in South Africa." Southern Forests: a Journal of Forest Science 73.3-4 (2011): 165–173.
Machado, Alexandre Reis, Danilo Batista Pinho, and Olinto Liparini Pereira. "Phylogeny, identification and pathogenicity of the Botryosphaeriaceae associated with collar and root rot of the biofuel plant Jatropha curcas in Brazil, with a description of new species of Lasiodiplodia." Fungal Diversity 67.1 (2014): 231–247.
Sakalidis, Monique L., et al. "Pathogenic Botryosphaeriaceae associated with Mangifera indica in the Kimberley region of Western Australia.” European journal of plant pathology 130.3 (2011): 379–391.

External links
MycoBank

Botryosphaeriaceae
Fungi described in 2010